Nashville Outlaws: A Tribute to Mötley Crüe is a 2014 studio album released via Big Machine Records. It is a tribute album to the heavy metal band Mötley Crüe, featuring covers of their songs performed by various country music artists. The album's lead single is a cover of "Home Sweet Home", recorded by Justin Moore as a duet with Mötley Crüe lead singer Vince Neil.

Critical reception
Stephen Thomas Erlewine of Allmusic rated it 2.5 stars out of 5, saying that "Maybe it doesn't hold together but, then again, there never was a clear pathway for this tribute to proceed anyway. The Crüe and country may share some common ground, but it's ungainly and only intermittently appealing, as this odd record makes clear." He praised the performances of LeAnn Rimes, The Mavericks, and Aaron Lewis. Jon Freeman of Country Weekly rated the album "B", praising the Mavericks' cover of "Dr. Feelgood" as the strongest track, as well as the performances by Moore, Rascal Flatts, Eli Young Band, and Gretchen Wilson. He found Aaron Lewis's cover of "Afraid" the most country-sounding, but criticized the performances of Cassadee Pope, Clare Bowen and Sam Palladio, and Big & Rich. Rolling Stone reviewer Nick Murray gave the album 2 out of 5 stars, with his review saying that "Unfortunately, few of the 15 featured artists do anything more than rehash their assigned song – often omitting even the slight twang Nashville usually requires." He also thought that the performances of LeAnn Rimes and The Mavericks were the strongest.

Commercial performance
The album debuted on the Billboard 200 at No. 5, and the Top Country Albums chart at No. 2, with sales of 31,000 in the U.S.  As of September 2014, the album has sold 55,000 copies in the U.S.

In Canada, the album debuted at number six on the Canadian Albums Chart, selling 2,700 copies in its first week.

Track listing

Chart performance

Weekly charts

Year-end charts

References

2014 albums
Big Machine Records compilation albums
Mötley Crüe tribute albums
Country albums by American artists
Country music compilation albums